Caponigro is an Italian surname. Notable people with the surname include:

Antonio Caponigro (1912–1980), American mobster
Jeff Caponigro, American public relations executive
John Paul Caponigro (born 1965), American photographer
Paul Caponigro (born 1932), American photographer

Italian-language surnames